Hamilton Chasi Guerrero (born 12 February 1990) is an Ecuadorian footballer currently playing for Barcelona SC.

International career
Chasi played for the under 20 Ecuador national football team since 2007. He was a starter and he helped Ecuador win the 2007 Pan American Games. He also participated in the 2009 South American Youth Championship, where Ecuador was eliminated in the group stage, because of loss in a coin toss decider.

Honours

National team
 Ecuador U-20
 Pan American Games: Gold Medal

References

1990 births
Living people
Association football fullbacks
Ecuadorian footballers
C.S.D. Macará footballers
C.D. Cuenca footballers
Barcelona S.C. footballers
Footballers at the 2007 Pan American Games
Pan American Games gold medalists for Ecuador
Pan American Games medalists in football
Medalists at the 2007 Pan American Games